Les Praeres (in Spanish, Las Praderas; English: The Prairies) is an area of mountain grassland that reaches an altitude of  above sea level, located in the Asturian municipality of Nava, in the north of Spain. The grassland is located in the middle of the Peñamayor mountain range, in an area of great environmental value.

Sport

Cycling
The area gained special attention when it was announced in 2017 as the finale for a stage of the 2018 Vuelta a España. It is climbed through a narrow  road with an average gradient of 13.5%. The highest gradient, near the top, is at 23%.

References

Geography of Asturias